Enola "Miz" Maxwell (August 30, 1919 – June 24, 2003) was an American civil rights activist from San Francisco in the United States.

In 1968, Maxwell became the first woman – and first black person – to be named as lay minister at a Presbyterian Church. In 1970, the church appointed Maxwell executive director of a multicultural community center in Potrero Hill, a role she served until her death at the age of 83.

In 2001, the Potrero Hill Middle School was renamed to the Enola D. Maxwell Middle School of the Arts.

Her daughter, Sophie Maxwell, was elected to the San Francisco Board of Supervisors in 2000.

References 

1919 births
2003 deaths
Activists from San Francisco
American civil rights activists